Edward Trowbridge Collins Jr. (November 23, 1916 – November 2, 2000) was an American professional baseball outfielder in the Major Leagues for parts of three seasons between  and  for the Philadelphia Athletics.

Career in baseball
Collins' father was Baseball Hall of Fame second baseman Eddie Collins, who is the only player in American baseball history to have more than 3,300 hits in under 10,000 at-bats. Born in the Philadelphia suburbs, the younger Collins attended the elite Episcopal Academy, graduating in the class of 1935. He went on to Yale University, where he played on the team that won the 1937 Ivy League championship. In 1939, his senior year, Collins was the Bulldogs' team captain. Upon graduation, he signed with the Philadelphia Athletics and played 32 games his rookie year, 1939. For the 1940 season, Collins joined the International League, playing for the Baltimore Orioles. Then, in 1941 season, he returned to the Athletics, appearing in a career-high 80 games. Collins played 20 games for the Athletics in 1942, before entering military service with the United States Navy.

After the war, Collins returned to the Athletics, but was released in April 1946. He went on to play in the International League for the Jersey City Giants and Buffalo Bisons before retiring from the field. In the Major Leagues, Collins appeared in 132 career games played and collected 66 hits, with nine doubles and three triples. He had 16 runs batted in.

Upon retiring as an active player, Collins joined the front office of the Philadelphia Phillies, working from 1947 to 1954 as assistant farm system director, and in 1954 and 1955 as assistant general manager.

Educator
In 1955, Collins received a master's degree in education from Harvard, and went on to teach at his alma mater, the Episcopal Academy, from 1960 to 1982. His specialty was American history, and he served for years as chair of the history department. At Episcopal, Collins also coached squash and baseball.

Family
Four weeks after the bombing of Pearl Harbor, Collins married Jane Pennock, the daughter of Hall of Fame pitcher Herb Pennock, who served as the general manager of the Phillies from 1944 until his sudden death in January 1948. The couple had known each other since childhood. The wedding, which took place at the Episcopal Church of the Advent in Kennett Square, Pennsylvania, was officiated by the Rev. Paul Collins, brother of the groom. The Collinses settled in Kennett Square, where the Pennock family had been landowners since the end of the seventeenth century. There they raised two sons, Peter and Edward Trowbridge Collins III. After 58 years of marriage, Eddie Collins and his wife Jane died within five weeks of each other in 2000.

See also
List of second-generation Major League Baseball players

References

1916 births
2000 deaths
Baltimore Orioles (IL) players
Baseball players from Pennsylvania
Buffalo Bisons (minor league) players
Educators from Pennsylvania
Episcopal Academy alumni
Harvard Graduate School of Education alumni
Jersey City Giants players
Major League Baseball outfielders
Military personnel from Pennsylvania
People from Lansdowne, Pennsylvania
Philadelphia Athletics players
Philadelphia Phillies executives
United States Navy officers
United States Navy personnel of World War II
Yale Bulldogs baseball players
Yale University alumni